Damned in Black is the sixth studio album by Norwegian black metal band Immortal. It was released on March 27, 2000 through Osmose Productions, making it their last album released through their long-time collaboration with the French record label. It's their first album where bass guitar duties are handled by Iscariah. Besides some death metal influences, mostly manifested in the opening track "Triumph", the musical style started to embrace a more blackened thrash metal sound, a style that would be more present on their next album, Sons of Northern Darkness. During the recording session in the Abyss studio, the band also recorded "From The Dark Past", cover version of influential norwegian black metal band Mayhem, which later appeared on Originators of the Northern Darkness - A Tribute to Mayhem compilation.

Release 

It is known that there were five different issues distributed next to the original jewel case: a limited edition digipak, a limited edition picture box case, a special cassette tape edition and a limited edition handnumbered vinyl pressing, which was released under Osmose Productions and was later reissued in 2005.

Track listing

Critical reception 

AllMusic wrote, "While it will most likely be overlooked considering Immortal's brightest and deadliest moments came before and after it (respectively)", "Damned in Black strikes one as being At the Heart of Winter and Sons of Northern Darkness' nasty, spiteful little brother, sounding slightly rushed, unkempt and panicky, with whirlwind blastbeats more prominent in the arrangements. But the album benefits from this approach; it's an angrier, more fiery record".

Personnel

Immortal
 Abbath Doom Occulta (Olve Eikemo) – vocals & guitar
 Iscariah (Stian Smørholm) – bass
 Horgh (Reidar Horghagen) – drums

Additional personnel
 Demonaz Doom Occulta (Harald Nævdal) – lyrics

Charts

References

External links 

 Damned in Black at Encyclopaedia Metallum

Immortal (band) albums
2000 albums
Albums produced by Peter Tägtgren
Albums with cover art by Jean-Pascal Fournier